Adolf Jäger (31 March 1889 – 21 November 1944) was a German amateur football (soccer) player who competed in the 1912 Summer Olympics.

Club career 
Jäger began his career with SC Union 03 Altona and played with Altona 93 from 1907 until 1927, where he would have scored over 2000 goals in over 700 amateur matches. However, the only proof or evidence, of this claim, may lie within newspaper articles from the time he played. Two injuries further shortened his military career and saved him from the fate of his teammates that would not return.

International career 
He was a member of the German Olympic squad and played one match in the main tournament, scoring the only goal for Germany in the main tournament.

Style of play 
Adolf would convince critics with exceptional passes and today he would be referred to as a "classic 10".

Later life 
He died during World War II, while working for bomb sweep in Hamburg, and is buried in Altona Main Cemetery.

References

External links
 

1889 births
1944 deaths
Footballers at the 1912 Summer Olympics
German footballers
Germany international footballers
German civilians killed in World War II
Olympic footballers of Germany
Footballers from Hamburg
Deaths by explosive device
Association football forwards
People from Altona, Hamburg
Deaths by airstrike during World War II